Green Hill is a mountain in Bergen County, New Jersey. It is part of the Ramapo Mountains.

References

External links 
 Ringwood State Park

Mountains of Bergen County, New Jersey
Mountains of New Jersey
Ramapos